Sykur (Sugar in Icelandic) is an Icelandic band, which was founded in 2008.

Mesópótamía, released in Iceland in 2011, saw the band develop their much-loved electro sound. Their single is "Curling", remixed by Dan Le Sac and Database.

Discography

Albums
2009: Frábært eða frábært
2011: Mesópótamía

Singles
2011: "Shed Those Tears"
2014: "Strange Loop"
2018: "Loving none"

References

Icelandic electronic music groups